The Joseph Wesley Young House is a historic home in Hollywood, Florida. It is located at 1055 Hollywood Boulevard. On August 10, 1989, it was added to the U.S. National Register of Historic Places. Joseph Wesley Young Jr. (1882–1934) was a founder and developer of Hollywood, Florida. He is listed as a Great Floridian.

The house is described as looking like a "Moorish castle with two-dozen rooms" and it may have a resident ghost. One of the "most venerable and storied mansions in Broward County" it was for sale in 2008.

Joseph Wesley Young
Young was a real estate developer in Long Beach, California and was married to Jessie Fay (Cooke) Young (1877–1955), a piano player and singer whom he married in 1902.  Although she was five years older than him, her lovely voice and personality captured his fancy when he moved to Long Beach in 1902.

In 1914 a huge flood in Long Beach wiped out the property Young was developing.

He was Hollywood's first mayor in 1925 and helped rebuild the city after a hurricane devastated it in 1926. His marketing helped bring Robert Anderson to the area. His Great Floridian plaque is at the Joseph W. Young house at 1055 Hollywood Blvd.

References

External links

 Broward County listings at National Register of Historic Places
 Florida Department of Historical Resources
 Broward County listings
 

Houses on the National Register of Historic Places in Florida
National Register of Historic Places in Broward County, Florida
Houses in Broward County, Florida
Buildings and structures in Hollywood, Florida